Brampton College, London is a co-educational private day school for students aged between 15 and 19 years, specialising in A levels. Founded in 1989 in Golders Green, it has been located in a period building in Hendon since 1998. In 2012, the college had 263 students.

College buildings
The college is based in a period building on Lodge Road, Hendon, and a separate building known as 'the annex', It comprises 32 classrooms, including three science laboratories, and a library, study hall, art studio and offices. The college makes use of the indoor and outdoor sports facilities of a nearby school and sports centre.

Academics
Brampton College offers the following subjects at A Level – Biology, Chemistry, Physics, Mathematics, Further Mathematics, Computer Science, Art, Photography, English, Religious Studies, French, Spanish, Italian, German, Latin, Classics, Economics, Business Studies, Psychology, Government & Politics, Sociology, Law, and Geography. A particular characteristic of the curriculum is flexibility: students are allowed to take a mixture of one-year, two-year and GCSE courses.

Results from the Department of Education results for Brampton College indicate the percentage of students receiving 3 A Levels at grades AAB or higher (in 2 subjects) was 28%, much higher than the average in England of 15%.

A large number of pupils at Brampton attended top schools in the UK, including, Harrow School, Highgate School, University College School, The Haberdashers' Boys' School, The Haberdashers' School for Girls', Merchant Taylors' School for Boys', St Albans Boys School, Aldenham School, Jewish Free School, Immanuel College, North London Collegiate School, and Mill Hill School.

School fees

The total cost of attending the college (Years 11-13) in 2018/19 is £23,935 (£7,845.00 per term). Scholarships are available to a select number of students.

Awards and recognition
In the School and College Performance Tables published by The Department for Education in January 2013, Brampton College has an Average Points Score per Examination Entry of 248.4, above the National Average of 215.6, and above the Independent Schools Average of 242.2.

The Department of Education figures for 2013 indicate that the percentage of students at the college receiving 3 A Levels at grades AAB or higher was 28%. The average for England is 15%.

The cirriculum encompasses GCSE and intensive one-year A levels as well as traditional A level courses. The college has been inspected by Ofsted in 2009 and judged to be in the category, "Outstanding". It was also inspected in 2012 by the Independent Schools Inspectorate, who described it as "excellent".

References

External links
 

1989 establishments in England
Private co-educational schools in London
Private schools in the London Borough of Barnet
Educational institutions established in 1989